Miracle of Science is the seventh studio album by singer/songwriter Marshall Crenshaw, and his first studio effort for the indie imprint Razor & Tie. Having left the major labels to increase his creative control, Crenshaw produced the album and played most of the instruments.

Due to its status as Crenshaw's first indie album and first largely-self performed album, Miracle of Science has been singled by Crenshaw as a "case of circling back" to his pre-major label roots. He was largely spurred to record the album due to his faith in the song "What Do You Dream Of?": he explained, "I had 'What Do You Dream Of' as of 1992, a few years before the album. To some extent it was about needing to do an album in order to get that song out. You couldn't just do a single back then, at least I didn't think so."

Crenshaw also revived "Starless Summer Sky" for the album, having co-written the song as "Starlit Summer Sky" in 1979. He recalled, "That was the first song that I ever co-wrote, or wrote, that I thought was great. It got passed over when I did my first album." For its recording on Miracle of Science, he tweaked the song's title by changing "starlit" to "starless" to "give it a little bit of a dark atmosphere." The album also features a cover of Grant Hart's "Twenty-Five Forty-One". Crenshaw noted, "I reached out to Grant around that time, when my record of the song was coming out. We were friendly after that, and I'd see him every once in a while, mostly when I had a gig in the Twin Cities."

Track listing
All songs written by Marshall Crenshaw, except where noted.
"soundbite" – 0:11
"What Do You Dream Of?" – 3:28
"Who Stole That Train" (Hy Heath) – 3:32
"Laughter" – 4:41
"Twenty-Five Forty-One" (Grant Hart) – 3:22
"Starless Summer Sky" (Crenshaw, Rick Cioffi, Fred Todd) – 3:11
"Only an Hour Ago" – 4:07
"Wondrous Place" (Bill Giant, Jeff Lewis) – 2:42
"The 'In' Crowd" (Billy Page) – 3:36
"Theme from 'Flaregun'" – 4:47
"Seven Miles an Hour" – 4:28
"There and Back Again" (Crenshaw, Glen Burtnik) – 5:13

2020 Revision
In 2020, the album was re-released on Crenshaw's own label with a new running order, some remixing, and 2 newly recorded songs.

"(Soundbite)" – 0:11
"What Do You Dream Of?" – 3:28
"Who Stole That Train" – 3:48
"Only an Hour Ago" – 4:20
"Theme from 'Flaregun'" – 4:51
"Laughter" – 4:41
"A Wondrous Place" – 2:42
"Twenty-Five Forty-One" – 3:22
"Starless Summer Sky" – 3:11
"The 'In' Crowd" – 3:36
"There and Back Again" – 5:13
"Rouh Na Selim Neves"* – 4:28 ["Seven Miles an Hour" recording played backwards]
"Seven Miles an Hour" – 4:30
"What the Hell I Got"* (Michel Pagliaro) – 3:38
"Misty Dreamer"* (Daniel Wylie) – 3:00

[*] - newly added for the reissue.

Personnel
Marshall Crenshaw - vocals, guitar, bass, drums, keyboards, percussion, tambourine, vibraphone
Brad Jones – bass, harmony vocals
Andy York – guitar, backing vocals
Jay Sdad – acoustic, electric and slide guitar, lap steel
Bill Lloyd – acoustic and electric guitar, mandolin
Les James Lester – drums, bongos
Greg Leisz – dobro
Byron House – bass
Fenner Kastner – drums
Kenny Margolis – piano
 Chris Carmichael – violin, cello
Crispin Cioe – saxophone
Larry Etkin – trumpet

References 

1996 albums
Marshall Crenshaw albums